The  was held on 1 February 2009 in Kannai Hall, Yokohama, Kanagawa, Japan.

Awards
 Best Film: Yōjirō Takita – Departures
 Best Actor: Kaoru Kobayashi – Kyūka and Kanki no Uta
 Best Actress: Eiko Koike – The Kiss
 Best Supporting Actor: Hidetoshi Nishijima – Kyūka, Tōnan Kadobeya Nikai no Onna, Oka o Koete
 Best Supporting Actress:
Ryōko Hirosue – Departures
Kimiko Yo – Departures, Maboroshi no Yamataikoku, Oka o Koete
 Best Director: Yōjirō Takita – Departures
 Best New Director: Yoshitaka Mori – Hyaku Hachi
 Best Screenplay: Kunitoshi Manda and Tamami Manda – The Kiss
 Best Cinematographer: Akiko Ashizawa – Tokyo Sonata, Kimi no Tomodachi, Shiawase no Kaori
 Best New Talent:
Riisa Naka – Cafe Isobe
Anna Ishibashi – Kimi no Tomodachi
Sarara Tsukifune – Sekai de Ichiban Utsukushii Yoru
 Special Jury Prize: Yoshitaka Mori – Hatsuratsu to Shite Suteki na Yokohama Eiga no Tanjō ni

Best 10
 Departures
 Gururi no koto
 Still Walking
 Children of the Dark
 United Red Army
 The Kiss
 Tokyo Sonata
 Climber's High
 Kimi no Tomodachi
 Kyūka
runner-up. One Million Yen Girl

References

Yokohama Film Festival
Yokohama Film Festival
Yokohama Film Festival
2009 in Japanese cinema
February 2009 events in Japan